Louis Rostollan (1 January 1936 – 13 November 2020) was a French professional road bicycle racer.

He was a professional from 1958 until 1967, winning the Critérium du Dauphiné Libéré in 1958 and the Tour de Romandie in 1960 and 1961.

Rostollan died on 13 November 2020 of a lung disease at the age of 84.

Major results

 1957
 2nd, Overall, Tour du Sud-Est
 3rd, Stage 5
 Critérium du Dauphiné Libéré
 1st, Stage 8b
 1st, Stage 4

 1958
 1st, Overall, Critérium du Dauphiné Libéré
 3rd, Stage 4

 1959
 1st, Cluny

 1960
 1st, Boucles Roquevairoises
 1st, Overall, Tour de Romandie
 3rd, Stage 1
 3rd, Stage 4b
 2nd,  National Road Championships

 1961
 1st, Overall, Tour de Champagne
 1st, Overall, Tour de Romandie
 1st, Stage 3
 1st, Vergt

 1962
 1st, Polymultipliée

 1964
 1st, Circuit d'Auvergne

 1965
 1st, Circuit des Boucles de la Seine

References

External links 

1936 births
2020 deaths
French male cyclists
Cyclists from Marseille
Deaths from lung disease